Christian Frederik Powisch or Christian Frederik Pogwisch (1650-1711) was a Norwegian government official. He served as the County Governor of Stavanger amt from 1687 until 1700. Then, he was appointed as the Diocesan Governor of Christianssand stiftamt (and simultaneously served as the County Governor of Nedenæs amt) from 1700 until his death in 1711.

References

1650 births
1711 deaths
County governors of Norway